Kaleb Jackson (born June 11, 1996) is an American soccer player who plays as a forward for AC Syracuse Pulse.

Career

College & Amateur
Jackson played four years of college soccer at Rockhurst University between 2014 and 2017. While at college, Jackson also appeared for National Premier Soccer League side AFC Ann Arbor during their 2017 season, where he scored three goals and tallied two assists. In 2018, Jackson made two appearances with Saint Louis Club Atletico during the team's inaugural season in the NPSL.

Professional
On March 19, 2019, Jackson signed with USL League One side South Georgia Tormenta.

In February 2020, Jackson was signed by Chattanooga FC of the National Independent Soccer Association.

Career statistics

References

External links
 
 Profile at Rockhurst University Athletics
 NISA profile

1996 births
Living people
AC Syracuse Pulse players
American soccer players
Association football forwards
AFC Ann Arbor players
Soccer players from St. Louis
Tormenta FC players
National Premier Soccer League players
USL League One players
National Independent Soccer Association players
Chattanooga FC players